"No More Sorrow" is a song by American rock band Linkin Park. The song serves as eighth track from their third studio album, Minutes to Midnight. The song was performed live and was included in the live album Road to Revolution: Live at Milton Keynes. The live version of the song was released as a promotional single in 2007.

Composition
The song starts with an instrumental intro leading to the vocals by the band's lead singer Chester Bennington. The song was recorded at 133 BPM and is in the key of E flat Minor. Brad Delson, the band's lead guitarist, uses an EBow in this song, which was originally planned for the song "The Little Things Give You Away".

Live
The song was performed live many times by the band from 2007 to 2011. The song has been a fan favorite song to be played live. The live version comes with an extended intro. The song was performed on March 14, 2007 as an AOL recording at North Hollywood, California. The first public performance was at Berlin, Germany on April 28, 2007. The song was performed at a concert in the Milton Keynes concert. A live version of the song was also released on LP Underground 7.0. The last known performance is on September 25, 2011.

Releases
The song was released as the eighth track of Linkin Park's third studio album, Minutes to Midnight. The song was also released on the live album, Road to Revolution: Live at Milton Keynes, and also as a promotional single. A live version of the song was also released in LP Underground 7.0. An 8-bit instrumental was released on the soundtrack, 8-Bit Rebellion.

Critical reception
"No More Sorrow" generally received positive reviews from critics. Rolling Stone stated "Bennington is not going over old-girlfriend ground when he promises, 'Your time is borrowed,' in the hammering thrash of 'No More Sorrow.'" Billboard reviewers stated that "One can detect bits of Metallica ("No More Sorrow")". Talking about softness of the album, Sputnik Music stated that "Despite the evident focus on the softer material, Minutes to Midnight does also have a few heavy moments, namely, "Given Up" and "No More Sorrow".

Track listing

Personnel
 Chester Bennington – lead vocals
 Mike Shinoda – rhythm guitar, backing vocals
 Brad Delson – lead guitar, backing vocals
 Joe Hahn – turntables, samplers
 Dave Farrell – bass guitar
 Rob Bourdon – drums, percussion

Charts
Even though the song did not chart on the Billboard Hot 100, it charted at number 24 on the Bubbling Under Hot 100 singles. It also gets moderate airplay on rock and alternative radio stations even to this day despite not charting on Billboards Mainstream Rock Tracks and Alternative Songs charts.

External links
 http://lplive.net/shows/db/2007/20070428
 http://lplive.net/shows/db/2007/20070314
 http://lplive.net/wiki/db/songs/all-songs-played-live
 https://www.youtube.com/watch?v=V4XrNq6eq9s
 https://www.youtube.com/watch?v=nup2ZpsB-jE

References

2007 songs
Linkin Park songs
American heavy metal songs